James Stinson may refer to:

 James Stinson (musician), a member of the electronic music duo Drexciya
 James Stinson (How I Met Your Mother), a character on the American TV series